Hesagi is a village in Nosratabad Rural District (Sistan and Baluchestan Province), in the Central District of Zahedan County, Sistan and Baluchestan Province, Iran. At the 2006 census, its population was 37, in 8 families.

References 

Populated places in Zahedan County